Miłcz  is a village in the administrative district of Gmina Wołów, within Wołów County, Lower Silesian Voivodeship, in south-western Poland.

History
Since the Middle Ages, the area was part of Piast-ruled Poland, and later on, before becoming a part of Bohemia (Czechia), Prussia, and Germany. During World War II, it was the location of a forced labour subcamp of the Nazi German prison for youth in Wołów. In 1945, following Germany's defeat in World War II, the village became part of Poland again.

Sports
The local football team is Sparta Miłcz. It competes in the lower leagues.

References

Villages in Wołów County